HFW may refer to:
 Holman Fenwick Willan, an international law firm
 Honey Frosted Wheaties
 Department of Health and Family Welfare (Tamil Nadu), India
 Ministry of Health and Family Welfare, India
 Ministry of Health and Family Welfare (Bangladesh)
 Hope for Wildlife, wildlife rescue centre and TV series
 Horizon Forbidden West, a video game released in February 2022
 Hugh Fearnley-Whittingstall, a British celebrity chef